Darryl & Don Ellis was an American country music duo formed in Beaver Falls, Pennsylvania in 1992. The duo consisted of brothers Darryl Ellis Gatlin and Don Ellis Gatlin. Their highest charting single, "No Sir," peaked at No. 58 on the Billboard Hot Country Singles & Tracks chart in 1992. Don Ellis wrote songs on Blake Shelton's first two albums, and later founded a second band called Savannah Jack.

Discography

Albums

Singles

Music videos

Awards & Nominations

Nominations
Country Music Association
 1993 Vocal Duo of the Year

Academy of Country Music
 1993 Top Vocal Duo of the Year

References

[ allmusic ((( Darryl & Don Ellis > Discography )))]

Country music groups from Pennsylvania
Country music duos
Sibling musical duos
Epic Records artists
Musical groups established in 1992